KZYK (88.9 FM) is a radio station licensed to serve the community of Santee, Nebraska. The station is owned by Nebraska Indian Community College, and airs a variety format.

The station was assigned the KZYK call letters by the Federal Communications Commission on February 10, 2011.

References

External links
 Official Website
 FCC Public Inspection File for KZYK
 

ZYK
Radio stations established in 2012
2012 establishments in Nebraska
Variety radio stations in the United States
ZYK
Knox County, Nebraska